Maxine Albro (January 20, 1893 – July 19, 1966) was an American painter, muralist, lithographer, mosaic artist, and sculptor. She was one of America's leading female artists, and one of the few women commissioned under the New Deal's Federal Art Project, which also employed Jackson Pollock, Mark Rothko, and Willem de Kooning.

Biographical sketch
Ethel Maxine Albro was born in 1893 in Ayrshire, Iowa, the daughter of Frank Albro, a grain buyer and piano salesman, and Cordelia Mead. She had an older brother, Francis, and a younger brother, Harold. She spent part of her youth in Estherville, Iowa. She grew up in Los Angeles. Her father's family came from England and settled in Rhode Island before moving west, and her mother's ancestors were of Irish-English descent.

The famed photographer Imogen Cunningham took a hauntingly intimate portrait of a shrouded Albro in 1931, adding her to a collection of notable painters that she had photographed, which included Frida Kahlo, Miguel Covarrubias, and Lyonel Feininger.

On March 28, 1938, Albro married fellow artist Parker Hall in Pima, Arizona. They moved to Carmel, California, and together they would return to Mexico numerous times throughout their lives.

Albro was a member of the American Artists' Congress, California Society of Mural Artists, California Art Club, and the Carmel Art Association.

Albro was 73 years old when she died in Los Angeles in 1966.

Career
In 1920, she moved to San Francisco after graduating from high school and worked as a commercial artist, then traveled to Paris to study at the Académie de la Grande Chaumière for a year. After she returned, Albro studied at the California School of Fine Arts from 1923 to 1925. A year later, she enrolled in the Art Students League of New York. In the early 1920s, she lived in Burlingame, California. In 1927, she first visited Mexico, where she would study fresco painting with Pablo O'Higgins, one of Diego Rivera's assistants, and eventually made the acquaintance of Diego Rivera.

Starting from 1925, Albro exhibited her works at the annual San Francisco Art Association show and influenced other artists to travel to Mexico, winning local fame as "a little Diego Rivera" and leading to numerous private commissions in 1929 and 1930, including the Spanish Farm fresco for the Allied Arts Guild in Menlo Park, California. In 1931, Albro had a major exhibition in New York City, in accord with the modern Mexican art renaissance that had been fostered in the city's galleries. Her first showing consisted of 30 paintings and 30 drawings, which The Art Digest called "a critical as well as a popular triumph."

Albro was one of the few women who were part of the Works Progress Administration's Federal Art Project, a program initiated under President Franklin Roosevelt's New Deal. Due to the high rate of joblessness during the Great Depression, these art programs were required to employ female artists, making this period the first time in history in which women were hired without discrimination in the United States. Her first WPA commission was for one of the murals at Coit Tower. According to Albro, she traded the wall she had originally picked with an adjacent one selected by Victor Arnautoff at his request.

Throughout the 1930s, Albro executed many commissions under the federal program, including a mosaic at San Francisco State Teacher's College in 1936, over the entrance to Woods Hall at the southeast corner of Haight and Buchanan. None of the artists working on the mosaic had ever created art in that medium, and the WPA had to hire an Italian mosaic setter that taught them how to break marble to create mosaic pieces and set them. The mosaic is no longer visible, having either been stored and then lost, or destroyed during removal when the campus was moved and the Teacher's College building was renamed to Anderson Hall at the University of California Extension in San Francisco.

Outside of artwork commissioned for public buildings, Albro painted frescoes for many private homes, including the entrance and courtyard of the Seldon Williams House in Berkeley, California, designed by Julia Morgan and completed in 1928.

A work of four nudes that Albro painted at the Ebell Women's Club in Los Angeles, titled Portly Roman Sybils, offended the organization's members, and was destroyed in 1935. That year, several prominent art critics, including the young Arthur Miller, rose to her defense.

"Personally I think they are beautiful decorations which deserve to live and which will be missed," Miller wrote.

The San Francisco News of May 25, 1935, printed the following:

Style

Albro's artistic style is described as "clean, bright and clear with the strong rounded forms of this era, often depicting the women of Mexico, in particular those of the Tehuantepec region in Oaxaca."

Her mural titled California at San Francisco's Coit Tower, which depicts the bounty of California's agricultural industry, was produced under the Works Progress Administration program.

In 1934, the Literary Digest wrote about Albro's California, comparing it to the other murals painted inside Coit Tower:

Two years earlier, following a successful Albro exhibition in San Francisco, art critic Junius Cravens wrote in the Argonaut:

Influences 

Albro was most recognized for her frescoes and her characteristic treatment of Mexican and Spanish subject matter. The influence of Mexican art is visible throughout her paintings, murals and lithographs. In an interview two years before her death, Albro said: 
In particular, Albro was strongly influenced by Diego Rivera. "Watching Diego [paint] was very beneficial to me," she said.

Impact 

Albro's works can be found in the Smithsonian American Art Museum, The Museum of Modern Art (MoMA), National Gallery of Art, National Museum of the American Indian, San Francisco's Coit Tower, Fine Arts Museums of San Francisco, Allied Arts Guild, and in various galleries and private collections.

Albro became a leader in the California muralist movement and was one of the first women to achieve such a prominent position. Her work was also highlighted by numerous paintings and lithographs, which are becoming rare and valuable collection pieces. Although she specialized in Spanish and Mexican motifs, she also painted landscapes and street scenes that were inspired by her world travels.

See also
 Visual art of the United States
 Public Works of Art Project
 Federal Art Project
 List of Federal Art Project artists

References

1893 births
1966 deaths
American muralists
People from Palo Alto County, Iowa
Artists from Iowa
Artists from the San Francisco Bay Area
San Francisco Art Institute alumni
Art Students League of New York alumni
American women painters
Alumni of the Académie de la Grande Chaumière
Fresco painters
20th-century American women artists
Women muralists
American women printmakers
Federal Art Project artists
Public Works of Art Project artists
20th-century American printmakers
People from Carmel-by-the-Sea, California